Parliamentary elections were held in Nauru on 9 July 2016. On 10 June 2016, the Parliament was dissolved by President Baron Waqa after it completed its three-year term. Speaker Ludwig Scotty called the elections for 9 July, with nominations taking place between 19 and 25 June 2016.

Electoral system
The 19 members of Parliament were elected from eight multi-member constituencies using the Dowdall system, a version of ranked voting; voters ranked candidates, with the votes counted as a fraction of 1 divided by the ranking number (e.g. a candidate ranked second will be scored as ½); the candidates with the highest total are elected.

Results

Aftermath
The newly elected Parliament convened on 13 July, with all new members joining the presidential majority, allowing Baron Waqa to be re-elected President by sixteen votes to two against opposition candidate Riddell Akua. Cyril Buraman was elected Speaker. Ludwig Scotty, the speaker of the previous Parliament, had lost his seat in Anabar.

References

Nauru
President
Elections in Nauru
Non-partisan elections